The Presidential Initiative for Artificial Intelligence and Computing (PIAIC) was launched by the President of Pakistan, Dr. Arif Alvi, to promote education, research and business opportunities in Artificial Intelligence, Blockchain, Internet of Things, and Cloud Native Computing. The initiative comes in a bid to enable Pakistan in making an imprint on the world’s path towards the Fourth Industrial Revolution. It aims to transform the fields of education, research, and business in Pakistan. President Dr. Arif Alvi had launched PIAIC to reshape Pakistan by revolutionising education, research and businesses through introducing latest cutting-edge technologies.

Available Programs 
PIAIC is currently offering following of the high end technologies:

 Artificial Intelligence
 Cloud Native and Mobile Web Computing
 Blockchain
 Internet of Things(IoT)

Distance Learning Education 
PIAIC offers programs for distance learning as well as on-site learning, allowing students from across Pakistan to enroll online. However, students need to be present for exams onsite in order to enroll into the program and for examinations throughout the course of study The program has an initial target to enroll as many as 100,000 students within a year. After a successful launch in Karachi with 12,000 students enrolling, PIAIC have started registering students in other major cities like Islamabad and Faisalabad and soon plan on offering programs in Lahore, Quetta, and Peshawar.

This initiative is a privately funded not-for-profit educational program that has partnership with non-profit and for-profit organizations like Panacloud, Saylani Welfare International Trust, and Pakistan Stock Exchange (PSX)

References 

Education in Pakistan